Tilman Nagel (born 19 April 1942, in Cottbus) is a German Orientalist and Professor Emeritus at the University of Göttingen. He is the author of books including The Koran and Timor the Conqueror. His book, Mohammed: Life and Legend, depicts what he sees as the historic reality of the life of Muhammad. One reviewer considers this "monumental piece of research" to remain "highly relevant for decades to come".

References 

1942 births
Living people
People from Cottbus
People from the Province of Brandenburg
German orientalists
German male non-fiction writers
20th-century German non-fiction writers
German Freemasons
Academic staff of the University of Göttingen
Members of the Göttingen Academy of Sciences and Humanities